The International Journal of Antimicrobial Agents is a scientific journal published by the International Society of Chemotherapy since 1991. For 10 years its Editor-in-Chief was Alasdair Macintosh Geddes, until his retirement in 2015.

References

External links 

 

English-language journals